Sinta Ozoliņa-Kovala (born 26 February 1988) is a Latvian javelin thrower. She is the 2007 European Junior silver medalist.

Personal life 
Ozoliņa was born on 26 February 1988 in Riga. She is married to Dainis Sprudzāns.

Career 
Ozoliņa-Kovala is coached by Valentīna Eiduka. In 2006, she competed at the World Junior Championships, reached the final and finished in sixth place. She won the silver medal at the 2007 European Junior Championships, finishing second only to Ukraine's Vira Rebryk.

In 2008, Ozoliņa-Kovala made her first appearance at the Summer Olympics. During the javelin throw qualification, she set a new Latvian record in javelin throw – 60.13m. This result also gave her a spot in the final, as that result was the twelfth best on the night. Two days later, in the final, Ozoliņa's best throw was 53.38m and she finished in 11th place.

Achievements

Personal bests

External links
 

1988 births
Living people
Athletes from Riga
Latvian female javelin throwers
Athletes (track and field) at the 2008 Summer Olympics
Athletes (track and field) at the 2012 Summer Olympics
Athletes (track and field) at the 2016 Summer Olympics
Olympic athletes of Latvia
World Athletics Championships athletes for Latvia